Heorhiy or Heorhy is used in Ukrainian (and occasionally Belarusian) as the equivalent of George or Georgiy. People with the name include:

Heorhiy Buschan (born 1994), Ukrainian football goalkeeper
Heorhiy Gongadze (1969 – 2000), Ukrainian journalist of Georgian origin
Heorhiy Kandratsyew (born 1960) Soviet Belarusian football player
Heorhiy Kirpa (1946 – 2004), Ukrainian railway manager, statesman and politician
Heorhiy Maiboroda (1913 – 1992), Ukrainian composer
Heorhiy Pohosov (born 1960), Soviet/Ukrainian sabre fencer
Heorhiy Pyatakov (1890 – 1937), Bolshevik revolutionary leader
Heorhy Tkachenko (1898 – 1993), Ukrainian artist and bandurist

See also
Georgy (disambiguation)
Georgii (disambiguation)
Georgie (disambiguation)
George (disambiguation)

Ukrainian masculine given names